Glenea corona is a species of beetle in the family Cerambycidae. It was described by James Thomson in 1879. It is known from the Nicobar and Andaman Islands.

References

corona
Beetles described in 1879